United Nations Security Council Resolution 1882 was unanimously adopted on 4 August 2009.

Resolution 
Parties to armed conflict engaging in patterns of "killing and maiming of children and/or rape and other sexual violence against children" must also be listed in the Secretary-General's reports on children in armed conflict, according to resolution 1882 (2009), adopted unanimously by the Security Council.

The Council action was the culmination of a day-long debate on 29 April during which Secretary-General Ban Ki-moon urged the 15-nation body to "strike a blow against... impunity" by, at a minimum, expanding its criteria to include on the “list of shame", parties committing rape and other serious sexual violence against children during armed conflict.

Before the vote, only state and non-state parties that had recruited child soldiers or used children in situations of armed conflict were explicitly named, the so-called list of shame, in annexes to the Secretary-General's annual report on the implementation of resolution 1612 (2005), which established a Monitoring and Reporting Mechanism and set up a working group on Children and Armed Conflict.

The reports cover compliance and progress in ending six grave violations: the recruitment and use of children; killing and maiming of children; rape and other grave sexual violence; abductions; attacks on schools and hospitals; and denial of humanitarian access to children. Document S/2009/158 lists 56 such parties, including 19 persistent violators who have been listed for more than four years.

See also 
List of United Nations Security Council Resolutions 1801 to 1900 (2008–2009)

References

External links
 
Text of the Resolution at undocs.org

 1882
August 2009 events
 1882